Hardeep Singh may refer to:

Hardeep Singh (field hockey), Indian field hockey player
Hardeep Singh (cricketer, born 1981), Indian cricketer
Hardeep Singh (cricketer, born 1995), Indian cricketer
Hardeep Singh (wrestler), Indian wrestler
Hardeep Singh Dang, Indian politician
Hardeep Singh Kohli, British-Indian writer and broadcaster
Hardeep Singh Puri, retired Indian Foreign Service officer